Elizabeth Cushman Titus Putnam is an American conservationist and founder of the Student Conservation Association.

Early life and education
Putnam graduated from Miss Porter's School in 1952 and from Vassar in 1955.

Founding SCA
As a student at Vassar College in the 1950s, Putnam admired the natural heritage of America's national parks, but worried limited federal financial resources would prevent proper maintenance of the pristine parklands.

In 1955, Putnam wrote her senior thesis at Vassar College, "A Proposed Student Conservation Corps". The idea, modeled after the federal Civilian Conservation Corps program (1933–42), was to take the burden of labor-intensive jobs such as entrance fee collecting or trail work from the National Park Service and shift to the proposed SCC.

Career 
After founding the Student Conservation Association in 1957, Putnam served as its President until her retirement in 1990.

She currently resides in Shaftsbury, Vermont,

Awards and honors
In 2018, Vassar and the Hudson Valley chapter of the Student Conservation Association (SCA) planted a tree in her honor at the 415 acre Vassar Ecological Preserve.
2016 - The Wilderness Society's Robert Marshall Award
2015 - New York State Outdoor Education Association Leadership Award
2014 - Doctor of Humane Letters, College of Wooster
2012 - The Corps Network Lifetime Achievement
In 2011, the Vermont legislature passed act R-107 to honor Putnam.
In 2010, Putnam won the second highest civilian award, the Presidential Citizens Medal, the first conservationist to win the honor.
 1982 - President Reagan - President's Volunteer Action Award
 1982 - Student Conservation Association - 25th Anniversary Award
 1980 - Garden Club of America - Conservation Achievement Award
 1974 - U.S. Department of the Interior - Distinguished Service Award
 1971 - Arizona Federated Garden Clubs - Distinguished Service Award
 1966 - Garden Club of America - Margaret Douglas Award

Gallery of the Student Conservation Association at work - an organization founded by Putnam in 1957

References

Living people
People from Shaftsbury, Vermont
American conservationists
Vassar College alumni
Miss Porter's School alumni
Presidential Citizens Medal recipients
People from North Hempstead, New York
Women environmentalists
Women conservationists
1933 births